U.S. Route 63 (US 63) is a , north–south United States Highway primarily in the Midwestern and Southern United States.

Route description

Louisiana

Arkansas

U.S. 63 enters into Arkansas from Louisiana concurrent with US 167 in Junction City. Just a few miles into the state, the two highways run on the eastern edge of El Dorado as an expressway. US 167 splits here, traveling towards Hampton. US 63 bypasses the town of Warren, crossing US 270. US 63 passes through the rural Cleveland County, then enters into Jefferson County.

In Jefferson County, US 63 serves the city of Pine Bluff. US 63 bypasses the city, running on the last 3 miles of I-530. Also in Pine Bluff, the highway overlaps with US 65 and US 79. US 63 runs northeast with US 79 until Stuttgart, where the highway runs north to Hazen. Just north of Hazen, US 63 overlaps with I-40 to Brinkley. In Brinkley, US 63 begins an overlap with US 49 north to Jonesboro. US 63 leaves US 49 and follows I-555 until I-555 terminates, together serving as a bypass for southern Jonesboro. In Hoxie, US 63 intersects with US 67 (Future I-57). Northwest of here near Portia the highway overlaps with US 412.

In Imboden US 62 joins this overlap. In Hardy, US 63 leaves the two highways. In Mammoth Spring, US 63 crosses into Missouri, traveling to West Plains.

While historically there were many non-concurrencies on US 63, many of those have been resolved. In 2016, US 63 from Jonesboro (including the US 49 concurrency) to Turrell was designated as I-555. As a result, US 63 was rerouted to run concurrently with US 49 from Brinkley to Jonesboro. US 63 then runs concurrently with US 49 and I-555 until Southwest Drive in Jonesboro, where it then continues northwest alone to its concurrency with US 412 at Portia, just northwest of Walnut Ridge.

Missouri

The highway passes south-to-north through Missouri, from Arkansas to Iowa, serving cities such as Rolla, Jefferson City, Columbia, Moberly, Macon, and Kirksville. Notable routes that are intersected include US 60 in Howell County, I-44 at Rolla, US 50 (with which it shares a concurrency into Jefferson City south of the Missouri River until it reaches the junction with US 54), US 54 (which it overlaps in Jefferson City from the junction with US 50 and crosses the Missouri River with on the Jefferson City Bridge), I-70 at Columbia, US 24 at Moberly, US 36 at Macon, and US 136 at Lancaster.

US 63 in Missouri was Route 7 from 1922 to 1926.

Iowa

US 63 passes south-to-north through Iowa. It enters the state from Missouri south of Bloomfield. Between Ottumwa and Oskaloosa, the highway overlaps Iowa Highway 163. This segment is an expressway which connects Des Moines with Burlington, with freeway bypasses of Ottumwa and Eddyville. Near Malcom, US 63 meets I-80. Only a few miles later, it joins US 6 westbound for several miles near Grinnell, then goes north again. At Toledo, it intersects US 30 and at Waterloo, US 63 meets US 20. An expressway section opened in October 2012, completing the four-lane link between Waterloo and New Hampton.  The highway enters Minnesota just north of Chester.

Minnesota

US 63 enters Minnesota from Iowa south of Spring Valley. After meeting I-90, US 63 serves the local airport and then intersects with US 52. In this area, US 63 is an expressway, but plans are to upgrade the highway to a freeway between Stewartville and the US 52 interchange. In 2014, US 63 was rerouted around downtown Rochester, running concurrently with US 52 to 75th St NW, jutting back to the east to the existing route. North of Rochester, the highway meets US 61 at Lake City. From there, the two routes run concurrently to Red Wing, where US 63 turns north and crosses the Mississippi River to enter Wisconsin over the Eisenhower Bridge.

The Minnesota section of US 63 is defined as Routes 59 and 161 in Minnesota Statutes §§ 161.114(2) and 161.115(92).

Wisconsin

US 63 enters Wisconsin south of Hager City. Near Baldwin, US 63 intersects I-94. The highway briefly overlaps near Spooner with US 53. At Trego, they separate and US 63 runs southwest to northeast, passing through Hayward and Cable most notably, and ending near Ashland at US 2. According to a 2013 law, the road is referred to as the "Gaylord Nelson Highway" throughout Wisconsin.

History

Though US 63 as a stand-alone highway had always ended at Turrell, Arkansas, before the 1999 extension, in the past it was concurrent with US 61/US 64/US 70/US 79 (and later I-55) on into Memphis, Tennessee, over the Memphis & Arkansas Bridge. Unlike the 1999 extension, this concurrency to Memphis was generally in line with the rest of US 63. Though some maps continued to show this concurrency until 1999, Arkansas had not recognized US 63 south of Turrell for many years, since at least the 1960s.

Major intersections
Louisiana
  in Ruston. US 63/US 167 travels concurrently to El Dorado, Arkansas.
Arkansas
  in El Dorado
  south of Warren
  in Warren
  in Pine Bluff. I-530/US 63/US 65 travels concurrently through the city. US 63/US 79 travels concurrently to Stuttgart.
  in Pine Bluff
  in Stuttgart
  in Hazen. The highways travel concurrently through the city.
  in Hazen. The highways travel concurrently to Brinkley.
  in Brinkley. The highways travel concurrently to Jonesboro.
  in Fair Oaks
  in Jonesboro. The highways travel concurrently through the city.
  in Walnut Ridge. The highways travel concurrently to Hoxie.
  southeast of Portia. The highways travel concurrently to Hardy.
  in Imboden. The highways travel concurrently to Hardy.
Missouri
  in West Plains. The highways travel concurrently through the city.
  southeast of Willow Springs. The highways travel concurrently to southeast of Cabool.
  in Rolla
  north of Westphalia. The highways travel concurrently to Jefferson City.
  in Jefferson City. US 54/US 63 travels concurrently through the city.
 in Columbia
  in Moberly
  in Macon
  south-southeast of Glenwood. The highways travel concurrently to Lancaster.
Iowa
  in Ottumwa. The highways travel concurrently to east of Ottumwa.
  south of Malcom
  north of Malcom. The highways travel concurrently to north-northwest of Malcom.
  in Toledo
  in Waterloo
  in Waterloo.
  west of Fredericksburg. The highways travel concurrently to New Hampton.
Minnesota
  in Stewartville
  in Rochester
  in Rochester
  in Lake City. The highways travel concurrently to Red Wing.
Wisconsin
  west of Ellsworth. The highways travel concurrently to east of Ellsworth.
  in Baldwin
  in Baldwin. The highways travel concurrently through the village.
  in Turtle Lake. The highways travel concurrently through the village.
  north-northeast of Spooner. The highways travel concurrently to Trego.
  west of Ashland

See also

Related routes
 Iowa Highway 163 - Formerly a spur of US 63 numbered US 163

Special routes

U.S. Route 63 Business in Warren, Arkansas
U.S. Route 63 Business in Pine Bluff, Arkansas
U.S. Route 63 Business in Marked Tree, Arkansas
U.S. Route 63 Business in Bono, Arkansas
U.S. Route 63 Business in Hoxie, Arkansas
U.S. Route 63 Business in Hardy, Arkansas
U.S. Route 63 Business in West Plains, Missouri
U.S. Route 63 Business in Willow Springs, Missouri
U.S. Route 63 Business in Moberly, Missouri
U.S. Route 63 Business in Ottumwa, Iowa
U.S. Route 63 Business in New Hampton, Iowa

References

External links

 Endpoints of US 63

U.S. Route 63
United States Numbered Highway System
U.S. Highways in Wisconsin
63